Ceil Lucas (born March 19, 1951) is an American linguist. Lucas is a professor emerita of Gallaudet University. Lucas was a professor in the Department of Linguistics at Gallaudet University until her retirement in 2014. Lucas is currently the editor of Sign Language Studies at Gallaudet University Press, a position she's held since 2009.

Lucas is known for her contributions to the field of linguistics, most notably in the research of American Sign Language.

Early life
Lucas was born in the United States but raised from ages five through twenty-one in Guatemala City and in Rome, Italy.
Lucas studied at Whitman College in Walla Walla, Washington, and received her BA in French and art history. Later, she earned her M.S. and PhD in linguistics from Georgetown University.

Career
In 1973, Lucas started teaching Italian and continues to do so.

Lucas began teaching at Gallaudet University in 1981 and, alongside Robert Johnson and Scott Liddell, was one of the inaugural faculty to teach in the university's new linguistics graduate program.

During her tenure at Gallaudet, Lucas served as principal investigator on two research projects in the field of sign language linguistics. The first of these was the large-scale project Sociolinguistic Variation In ASL (funded by the National Science Foundation Grant Numbers: SBR 9310116, SBR 9709522). The results of this study are summarized in the book Sociolinguistic Variation in American Sign Language (2001). (Results of its pilot study are discussed in the introductory chapter of Sociolinguistics in Deaf Communities (1995).) The second project became titled The History and Structure of Black ASL (funded by The Spencer Foundation and NSF, Grant Numbers: BCS-0813736, DRL-0936085). The results of this study are summarized in the book The Hidden Treasure of Black ASL: Its History and Structure (2011).

Lucas also holds an M.A. from the University of Texas at Austin.

Lucas was awarded professor emerita status in 2014.

Bibliography
 Lucas, Ceil (ed.). 1990. Sign Language Research: Theoretical Issues. Washington, D.C.: Gallaudet University Press.
 Lucas, Ceil, and Clayton Valli. 1992. Language Contact in the American Deaf Community. Academic Press.
 Lucas, Ceil (ed.). 1995. Sociolinguistics in Deaf Communities. Washington, D.C.: Gallaudet University Press. , .
 Lucas, Ceil (ed.). 1996. Multicultural Aspects of Sociolinguistics in Deaf Communities. Washington, D.C.: Gallaudet University Press. .
 Lucas, Ceil (ed.). 1998. Pinky Extension and Eye Gaze: Language Use in Deaf Communities. Washington, D.C.: Gallaudet University Press. , .
 Lucas, Ceil, Robert Bayley, and Clayton Valli. 2001. Sociolinguistic Variation in American Sign Language. Washington, D.C.: Gallaudet University Press. , .
 Lucas, Ceil (ed.). 2001. The Sociolinguistics of Sign Languages. Cambridge University Press.
 Lucas, Ceil, Robert Bayley, and Clayton Valli. 2003. What's Your Sign for Pizza?: An Introduction to Variation in American Sign Language. Washington, D.C.: Gallaudet University Press. .
 Lucas, Ceil (ed.). 2002. Turn-Taking, Fingerspelling, and Contact in Signed Languages. Washington, D.C.: Gallaudet University Press. , .
 Lucas, Ceil (ed.). 2003. Language and the Law in Deaf Communities. Washington, D.C.: Gallaudet University Press. .
 Valli, Clayton, Ceil Lucas, Kristin J. Mulrooney, and Miako N.P. Rankin. 2011. Linguistics of American Sign Language: An Introduction. 5th edition. Washington, D.C.: Gallaudet University Press. .
 McCaskill, Carolyn, Ceil Lucas, Robert Bayley, and Joseph Hill. 2011. The Hidden Treasure of Black ASL: Its History and Structure . Washington, D.C.: Gallaudet University Press. .
 Bayley, Robert, Richard Cameron, and Ceil Lucas. 2013. The Oxford Handbook of Sociolinguistics. Oxford University Press.
 Schembri, Adam C., and Ceil Lucas. 2015. Sociolinguistics and Deaf Communities. Cambridge University Press.

References

External links 
 Sign Language Studies Editorial Board
 The Black ASL Project
 Gallaudet Video Library, Linguistic Video Collection (This collection contains video data from both the Sociolinguistic Variation In ASL and The History and Structure of Black ASL projects.)

1951 births
Living people
Linguists from the United States
Women linguists
Whitman College alumni
Gallaudet University faculty
Academic journal editors
Georgetown University alumni